Justine Tanya Bateman (born February 19, 1966)  is an American writer, director and producer. Her former acting work includes Family Ties, Satisfaction, Men Behaving Badly, The TV Set, Desperate Housewives, and Californication. Her feature film directorial debut, Violet, starring Olivia Munn, Luke Bracey, and Justin Theroux, premiered at the 2021 SXSW Film Festival. Bateman also wrote, directed and produced the film short Five Minutes, which premiered at the 2017 Toronto International Film Festival.

Early life
Bateman was born to Victoria Elizabeth, a former flight attendant for Pan Am who was originally from the United Kingdom, and Kent Bateman. She is the older sister of actor Jason Bateman.

She attended Taft High School in Woodland Hills, California. However, Bateman could not attend college at the time due to her contractual obligations with Family Ties. Bateman stated that she was informed by the series' line producer Carol Himes, "You're under contract to Paramount Studios."

Career

Acting
Bateman's most prominent acting role began when she was a teenager, playing the role of superficial Mallory Keaton on the television sitcom Family Ties in 1982; she continued the role throughout the show's run which ended in 1989. She hosted an episode of Saturday Night Live during its 13th season in 1988. 

In the 1996–97 NBC American version of the British TV comedy Men Behaving Badly, featuring Rob Schneider and Ron Eldard, she starred as Sarah, Eldard's character's girlfriend. Bateman returned to TV with the 2003 Showtime mini-series Out of Order, alongside Eric Stoltz, Felicity Huffman and William H. Macy.

In the third-season Arrested Development episode "Family Ties," which was broadcast in February 2006, her character is initially believed to be Michael Bluth's sister, but she turns out to be a prostitute taken advantage of by his father, and pimped by his brother. Michael Bluth was played by Bateman's brother Jason.

Recurring roles included Men in Trees, Still Standing, and Desperate Housewives.

In 1988, Bateman starred in the lead role in the motion picture Satisfaction. The film, about an all-girl musical band, also featured Julia Roberts, Liam Neeson, and Britta Phillips. Bateman starred as the lead vocalist and also performed the vocals on the soundtrack. Other films include The Night We Never Met, with Matthew Broderick, and The TV Set, with David Duchovny and Sigourney Weaver.

Bateman has acted in several web series. She acted in John August's Remnants, Illeana Douglas'  IKEA-sponsored Easy to Assemble (for which in 2010 Bateman was among the winners of the Streamy Award for Best Ensemble Cast and was nominated for a Streamy Award for Best Actress in a Comedy Web-Series), and Anthony Zuiker's digi-novel series Level 26: Dark Prophecy, in which she plays a tarot card reader.

Bateman's theater experience includes Arthur Miller's The Crucible (Roundabout Theater), David Mamet's Speed the Plow (Williamstown Theater Fest), and Frank Wedekind's Lulu (Berkeley Rep).

Writer
 
Bateman wrote her feature film directorial debut, Violet, premiered at the 2021 SXSW Film Festival. Bateman also wrote her short film directorial debut, Five Minutes. It premiered at the Toronto International Film Festival in 2017. She made her first script sale to Disney's Wizards of Waverly Place. She also co-wrote the adaptation of Lisi Harrison's teenage book series The Clique for a Warner Bros. internet series. Bateman's first book, Fame: The Hijacking of Reality, was published in 2018 by Akashic Books. Her second book, Face: One Square Foot of Skin, was also published by Akashic Books in 2021.

Producer

In the fall of 2007, Bateman helped produce the Speechless campaign in support of the Writers Guild of America strike. 

Bateman also co-produced and co-presented with fashion maven Kelly Cutrone on their internet talk show Wake Up and Get Real (WUAGR). Described as an alternative to the television series The View, WUAGR was last broadcast in June 2011. She was also a producer on the internet series Easy to Assemble (which garnered more than 5.1 million views during its second season.),

Bateman produced the film short, Z, Five Minutes (Toronto Film Festival 2017 premiere), and Push, and the feature film, Violet (SXSW 2021 Film Festival Premiere).

Her production company is Section 5.

Director
Her feature film directorial debut, Violet, starring Olivia Munn, Justin Theroux, and Luke Bracey, premiered at the SXSW 2021 film festival. Her short film directorial debut, Five Minutes, was an official selection at various film festivals, including the 2017 Toronto International Film Festival and the 2018 Tribeca Film Festival. It was a winner in Amazon Prime's Festival Stars competition, and one of Vimeo's Short of the Week.

Other work
During a hiatus from the entertainment business, Bateman established a clothing design company in 2000. She managed it until its closure in 2003. Justine Bateman Designs was known for one-of-a-kind hand knits. It sold to BendelsNY, Saks Fifth Avenue, and Fred Segal.

She served on the national board of directors of the Screen Actors Guild until July 2009, when she resigned just before the end of her initial three-year term.

Personal life
In 2001, Bateman married Mark Fluent, with whom she has two children. An outspoken supporter of net neutrality, she testified before the United States Senate Commerce Committee in support of it in 2008.

Bateman earned a degree in computer science and digital media management from the University of California, Los Angeles (UCLA) in 2016.

Bateman is a licensed pilot of single-engine planes and a certified scuba diver.

Filmography

References

Further reading 
 Dye, David. Child and Youth Actors: Filmography of Their Entire Careers, 1914-1985. Jefferson, NC: McFarland & Co., 1988, p. 13.

External links

Her film project site
Her college blog, done as tanya77

Living people
20th-century American actresses
21st-century American actresses
Actresses from New York (state)
American child actresses
American film actresses
American people of English descent
American television actresses
American web series actresses
People from Rye, New York
William Howard Taft Charter High School alumni
University of California, Los Angeles alumni
1966 births